Kaminuma (written: 上沼 or 神沼) is a Japanese surname. Notable people with the surname include:

, Japanese singer

Fictional characters
, a character in the visual novel Orange Pocket

See also
Kaminuma Bluff, a bluff on Ross Island, Antarctica
Kaminuma Crag, a nunatak of Antarctica

Japanese-language surnames